Small Form Variants is a Unicode block containing small punctuation characters for compatibility with the Chinese National Standard CNS 11643. Its block name in Unicode 1.0 was simply Small Variants.

References 

Unicode blocks